Cervelli is an Italian surname. Notable people with this surname include:

Federico Cervelli (1625– 1700), Italian painter
Francisco Cervelli (born 1986), Italian-Venezuelan baseball player

Italian-language surnames